The Sheepshead Bay station is an express station on the BMT Brighton Line of the New York City Subway. It is located in the Sheepshead Bay neighborhood of Brooklyn. It is served by the Q train at all times and by the B train on weekdays.

History 
In April 1931, as part of project to extend the station platforms, a new entrance opened at Voohries Avenue.

It was renovated by New York City Transit’s in-house maintenance-of-way forces in 1997-1998.

In December 2008, a wooden pedestrian bridge was built above the express tracks that connected the two platforms near the north end of this station. This was for passengers wishing to transfer between directions during reconstruction of Avenue U and Neck Road. The bridge was removed in September 2010.

In 2019, as part of an initiative to increase the accessibility of the New York City Subway system, the MTA announced that it would install elevators at the Sheepshead Bay station as part of the MTA's 2020–2024 Capital Program. In November 2022, the MTA announced that it would award a $965 million contract for the installation of 21 elevators across eight stations, including Sheepshead Bay. A joint venture of ASTM and Halmar International would construct the elevators under a public-private partnership.

Station layout

This station, which is located on an embankment, has four tracks and two island platforms, and is an express station. The platforms curve to the west at the south end and were extended to the north on both sides. There is clear evidence of this extension by looking underneath the platforms. This station originally was a terminal stop as the extension to Brighton Beach was not built until 1917. Outside and to the east of the Voorhies Avenue side entrance, there is a pedestrian overpass running alongside the Manhattan-bound side of line, but it only crosses the Belt Parkway to the south side.

The 1998 artwork here is called Postcards from Sheepshead Bay by Deborah Goletz. Made of ceramic tile, it draws the faces and life on the "Bay" (as Brooklyn residents call it short for Sheepshead Bay). The three artwork designs are a diner, some people wearing 17th century clothing near a boat dock, and a fisherman. A closer examination of the tile band at the mezzanine level has seashells and Pisces fish. Outside the station is a mural in the style of a "Welcome to Sheepshead Bay" postcard. As a homage to similar boardwalk attractions, this mural features holes for people inside to stick their faces through, and have their picture taken from outside.

Exits
In addition to the aforementioned interactive mural, the full-time entrance at Sheepshead Bay Road and East 16th Street also has a bench facing fare control and two overhead heaters. This side has two stairs to each platform. There was a small arcade of stores starting on the side opposite of the station agent booth prior to the station's renovation, but it was rearranged and broken up into several stores.

The part-time entrance to Voorhies Avenue is at the very south end of the platforms and each has one staircase to the mezzanine. This side had a booth until 2010 that was open only during weekday mornings. It now has a regular bank of turnstiles that is only open weekdays and is HEET access other times.

Both mezzanines have BMT-style directional mosaics tablets that says "To Manhattan" and "To Coney Island."

Gallery

In popular culture
The station was featured in the film version of Glengarry Glen Ross.

References

External links 

 
 Station Reporter — Q Train
 MTA's Arts For Transit — Sheepshead Bay (BMT Brighton Line)
 The Subway Nut — Sheepshead Bay Pictures
 Sheepshead Bay Road entrance from Google Maps Street View
 Voorhies Avenue entrance from Google Maps Street View
 Platforms from Google Maps Street View

BMT Brighton Line stations
New York City Subway stations in Brooklyn
Railway stations in the United States opened in 1907
BMT
1908 establishments in New York City